Gerry O'Neill (13 April 1919 – 1 August 2004) was an Australian rules footballer who played with Footscray in the Victorian Football League (VFL).		

O'Neill served in World War II, initially enlisting in the Australian Army but transferring to the Royal Australian Air Force in 1943 where he served in the 2nd Airfield Construction Squadron. O'Neill played for Footscray during his period of war service.

Notes

External links 
		

1919 births
2004 deaths
Australian rules footballers from Victoria (Australia)
Western Bulldogs players